Gigi Goode (born December 2, 1997) is an American drag queen and reality television personality known for being a runner-up on the twelfth season of the drag competition series RuPaul's Drag Race. Following her appearance on Drag Race, Goode was cast in the Drive 'N Drag concert series, appeared in multiple music videos, and participated in a Savage X Fenty fashion show. In 2020, she received a People's Choice Award in the Competition Contestant category. Originally from Woodstock, Illinois, Goode attended Millikin University and, as of 2020, lives in Los Angeles.

Early life and education 
Goode was born on December 2, 1997, in Woodstock, Illinois, and has Scottish and Scandinavian ancestry. Her mother, Kristi, is a costume and interior designer. Goode was introduced to LGBT culture at the age of 12 by her openly gay uncle. She started doing drag at an early age with the help of her mother, who initially disapproved of it, and she performed in drag in public for the first time at age 15. She has said that her drag "became very 1950s and 1940s inspired".

Goode attended Woodstock High School, where she graduated in 2016. She attended Millikin University in Decatur, Illinois, where she majored in art and was awarded the David S. Monroe Art Award in 2017, which honors "outstanding achievement in art, recognizing students for their major, excellence in their work and exhibiting a professional attitude". She later dropped out of Millikin and moved to Los Angeles.

Career 

In 2020, Goode competed on the twelfth season of the reality competition series RuPaul's Drag Race, where she was the youngest contestant of the season and placed as a runner-up. Goode and her mother collaborated on many of the outfits Goode wore on the show. Goode won the main challenges in episodes 4, 6, 7, and 12. During Snatch Game, she impersonated Maria the Robot, a character based on the experimental humanoid robot Sophia. Jezebel called her portrayal of Maria "physical comedy gold" and "incredibly witty". Critics praised Goode's performance on the show, highlighting her fashion and comedy skills.

Goode participated in Werq the World Battle Royale, a livestreamed fundraiser and drag show held during the COVID-19 pandemic. In mid-2020, she was one of a dozen former Drag Race contestants who was cast in the Drive 'N Drag concert series. Goode appeared in the Halloween-themed World of Wonder variety special Bring Back My Ghouls with other contestants from season 12 of Drag Race in October 2020.

Goode appeared in the music video for Chester Lockhart's 2018 cover of "I Put a Spell on You". In 2020, she and fellow Drag Race contestant Valentina appeared in the music video for "I'm Ready" by Sam Smith and Demi Lovato. Goode and fellow Drag Race contestants Jaida Essence Hall and Shea Couleé appeared in the Savage X Fenty fashion show and Amazon Prime Video special Savage X Fenty Show Vol. 2. At the 46th People's Choice Awards, she won an award in the "Competition Contestant of 2020" category.

Personal life 
Initially identifying as genderfluid on RuPaul's Drag Race, Goode came out as transgender and non-binary on August 29, 2021, with a video on Instagram. She announced that she had started hormone replacement therapy in January 2021 and underwent facial feminization surgery. Goode uses she/her pronouns.

During quarantine in 2020 she was living with the Los Angeles-based House of Avalon, which was described by Vogue Liam Hess as a "troupe of queer creatives", as of April 2020.

Filmography

Television

Web series

Music videos

Discography

Featured singles

See also 
 List of people with non-binary gender identities

References

External links 

 Gigi Goode at IMDb
 

1997 births
Living people
American drag queens
American people of Scandinavian descent
American people of Scottish descent
LGBT people from California
LGBT people from Illinois
Millikin University alumni
Non-binary drag performers
People from Los Angeles
People from Woodstock, Illinois
Gigi Goode
Transgender drag performers
Transgender non-binary people
Genderfluid people